The term the British air services refers to:

During World War I
Royal Flying Corps (1912 - 1918)
Royal Naval Air Service (1914 - 1918)
Royal Air Force (1918)

Post World War I
Royal Air Force (1918 onwards)
Fleet Air Arm (1924–1937 as part of the Royal Air Force, 1937 onwards as part of the Royal Navy)
Army Air Corps (United Kingdom) (1942 onwards)